Viotti is an Italian surname. Notable people with the surname include:

 Giovanni Battista Viotti Italian composer
 Giulio Viotti, Italian painter
 Marcello Viotti, Swiss conductor (1954–2005)
 Maria Luiza Ribeiro Viotti, Brazilian diplomat
 Sérgio Viotti, Brazilian actor and director
 Sergio Viotti (footballer) (born 1990)

Other
 Carrozzeria Viotti
 Viotti International Music Competition
 Viotti Stradivarius
 Viotti Festival

Italian-language surnames